Monkey Grip is the debut album by Rolling Stones bassist Bill Wyman.  It was released in 1974 by Rolling Stones Records.

Although Wyman sings on every track on the album, he had only sung lead on one song in the Rolling Stones, the 1967 song "In Another Land".

Critical reception
In a retrospective review, AllMusic rated the album four stars out of five. They noted "I Wanna Get Me a Gun", "White Lightnin" and "I'll Pull You Thro" as the best songs on the album and hinted approval of Wyman's vocals, describing them as "loose and joy-filled". They also praised the album for avoiding the usual egotism of solo albums: "Though these types of albums can be self-absorbed affairs, Monkey Grip is meant to be a relaxed, unpretentious outlet for the compositions that would never see the light of day in Wyman's main band -- and, as a credit to the bassist, it comes off exactly that way."

Track listing
All tracks composed and arranged by Bill Wyman, except where noted.

Personnel
Bill Wyman – lead vocals, bass guitar on tracks 1-5,8,9, electric guitar on "What a Blow", Jew's harp and acoustic guitar on "Pussy", piano, acoustic guitar and backing vocals on "Mighty Fine Time", acoustic guitar on "White Lightnin'" and "I'll Pull You Thro'", horn arrangements
Leon Russell – piano on "Mighty Fine Time"
Dr. John – piano on "I Wanna Get Me a Gun", organ and pedalboard on "What a Blow"
Hubert Heard – organ on "I'll Pull You Thro'", piano and organ on "It's a Wonder"
Lowell George – lead guitar on "Monkey Grip Glue"
William Smith - piano on "Monkey Grip Glue"
Danny Kortchmar – electric guitar on tracks 1,2,4-6,9, 12-string guitar on "White Lightnin'" and "I'll Pull You Thro'"
Joe Lala - percussion on tracks 1-3,5-9
Joey Murcia – electric guitar on "Crazy Woman"
Duane Smith - piano on "Crazy Woman" and "I'll Pull You Thro'"
George Terry - slide guitar on "Crazy Woman", electric guitar on "I'll Pull You Thro'"
Wayne Perkins – guitar
John McEuen – banjo on "Pussy", dobro and mandolin on "White Lightnin'"
Byron Berline – fiddle on "Pussy" and "What a Blow"
Peter Graves - trombone and euphonium on tracks 1,2,4-6,8, trombone on "Pussy", horn arrangements 
Gwen McCrae – backing vocals on tracks 1,2,5,8,9
George McCrae - backing vocals on tracks 1,2,5,8,9
Betty Wright – backing vocals on tracks 1,2,5,8,9
Jackie Clark - electric guitar on "Mighty Fine Time" and "I'll Pull You Thro'"
Abigale Haness – backing vocals on "Mighty Fine Time"
Mark Colby – tenor and soprano saxophone, clarinet on tracks 1,2,4-6,8
Neal Bonsanti – English horn, tenor and baritone saxophone on tracks 1,2,4-6,8
Ken Faulk - trumpet and flugelhorn on tracks 1,2,4-6,8
Bruce Rowland – drums 
Technical
Howard Albert, Ron Albert - assistant production, engineer, mixing
Jimmy Wachtel - design, artwork
Bob Jenkins - photography

Charts

Release information
  10 May 1974 LP Atlantic COC 79100 (Inner Sleeve)
  10 May 1974 LP Atlantic COC 79100 0698 (Inner Sleeve) (Promo)
  1974 LP (Quadra Disc) Atlantic QD 79100 (Inner Sleeve)
  1974 MC Atlantic (Slide Box)
  1974 8-Track Atlantic TP 79100
  March 1997 CD One Way Records OW 34520 046633452021
  21 November 2006 CD Castle 02182-36266-2 021823626628 (Expanded Edition)
  May 1974 LP Atlantic COC 79100 (Inner Sleeve)
  15 May 1974 LP RSR COC 59102 (Inner Sleeve and Front Cover Labels)
  15 May 1974 LP RSR COC 59102 (Inner Sleeve) (Promo)
  24 June 1996 CD Sequel Rec. NEM CD 846
  July 1974 LP RSR/WEA COC 79100
  July 1974 MC RSR/WEA M5S 79100
  1974 LP RSR/Music Hall Records 50-14.122 (Inner Sleeve) (Serie Super Lujo Especial)
  25 November 1995 CD Trattoria PSCR-5413 4988023032245
  25 November 1995 CD Trattoria PSCR-5413 / 381483 4988023032245 (Promo)
  24 August 2005 CD Imperial TECI 24302 4988004097119 (Paper Sleeve)
  21 November 2006 CD Castle CMRCD1362 5050749413628 (Expanded Edition)

References

1974 debut albums
Rolling Stones Records albums
Albums with cover art by Jimmy Wachtel
Bill Wyman albums